Parasitaphelenchidae is a family of nematodes belonging to the order Aphelenchida.

Genera:
 Bursaphelenchus
 Parasitaphelenchus

References

Nematodes